Bischwiller is a commune in the Bas-Rhin department in Grand Est in northeastern France, just west of the river Moder.

Geography 

The Moder, a Rhine tributary, flows across the town. Among the other streams which cross the area can be cited the following tributaries of the Moder: the Rothbaechel, the Erlengraben and the Waschgraben. The last one is formed by the confluence of two smaller streams named Weihergraben and Schnuchgraben.

Population
Due to its large Turkish minority, Bischwiller has been pejoratively dubbed "Turcwiller" or "Bischtanbul".

Culture

Maison des Arts (Bischwiller)
Musée de la Laub

Personalities
 Henri Baumer, master carpenter
 Claude Vigée, poet
 Jacob Kirkman and Abraham Kirkman, harpsichord makers
 Jean Daum, glassware manufacturer
 Lucien Muller, footballer
 Otto Meißner, German politician
 Christian Goodnight (born Christian Gutknecht) is a direct-line ancestor of former U.S. President Barack Obama.

Photo gallery

See also
Communes of the Bas-Rhin department

Notes

References

External links

Official website 

Communes of Bas-Rhin